Chemnitz is an electoral constituency (German: Wahlkreis) represented in the Bundestag. It elects one member via first-past-the-post voting. Under the current constituency numbering system, it is designated as constituency 162. It is located in western Saxony, comprising the city of Chemnitz.

Chemnitz was created for the inaugural 1990 federal election after German reunification. Since 2021, it has been represented by Detlef Müller of the Social Democratic Party (SPD).

Geography
Chemnitz is located in western Saxony. As of the 2021 federal election, it is coterminous with the independent city of Chemnitz.

History
Chemnitz was created after German reunification in 1990, then known as Chemnitz I. It acquired its current name in the 2002 election. In the 1990 through 1998 elections, it was constituency 323 in the numbering system. In the 2002 and 2005 elections, it was number 164. In the 2009 election, it was number 163. Since 2013, it has been number 162.

Originally, the constituency comprised the Stadtbezirke of Mitte-Nord, West, and Süd I from the independent city of Chemnitz. It acquired its current borders in the 2002 election.

Members
The constituency was first represented by Rudolf Meinl of the Christian Democratic Union (CDU) from 1990 to 1998. It was won by Jelena Hoffmann of the Social Democratic Party (SPD) in 1998. She was succeeded by fellow SPD member Detlef Müller in the 2005 election. Frank Heinrich of the CDU was elected in 2009, and re-elected in 2013 and 2017. Former member Müller regained the constituency for the SPD in 2021.

Election results

2021 election

2017 election

2013 election

2009 election

References

Federal electoral districts in Saxony
1990 establishments in Germany
Constituencies established in 1990
Chemnitz